Nicolas "Nic" Rausch (20 August 1900 in Bigonville – 13 March 1977) was a Luxembourgian cyclist. He competed in two events at the 1924 Summer Olympics.

References

External links
 

1900 births
1977 deaths
Luxembourgian male cyclists
Olympic cyclists of Luxembourg
Cyclists at the 1924 Summer Olympics
People from Rambrouch